Kaj (Kay) Gynt (pseudonym of Karin Sophia Matthiessen; née Karin Sophia Cederstrand; 24 October 1885 – 1956) was a Swedish-turned-American actress and, for one notable 1927 Broadway musical, a book writer.

Career 
Actress
Before emigrating to New York, Gynt performed three years with the Royal Dramatic Theatre in Stockholm. In America, she played Kate in the 1917 film The Eternal Mother and was a skating party guest in the 1917 film, The Last Sentence, directed by Ben Turbett. In 1921, Gynt played Clorinda in Henry Bataille's 3-act romantic comedy, Don Juan, at the Garrick Theatre, New York.

Author
She authored the book for the 1927 Broadway musical revue, Rang Tang. She also co-authored, in 1936 with Langston Hughes, a proposed production, Cock o' the World, music by Duke Ellington, Wilbur Hughes Strickland, MD (1903–1987), and Billy Strayhorn. The work was never performed.

Growing up, emigration, marriage, and family 
Gynt grew-up in Stockholm and was friends with Greta Garbo.  At age , she and Harold Gustav Frederic Matthiessen (1883–1940) arrived at Ellis Island, New York, December 21, 1907, aboard the SS Kaiserin Auguste Victoria from Cuxhaven. That same day, they married each other at the Gustavus Adolphus Lutheran Church, 155 East 22nd Street (between Lexington and Third Avenues). Their marriage was officiated by Rev. Dr. Johan Gustaf Mauritz Stolpe (1858–1938), son of composer Gustav Stolpe (1833–1901). In 1917, Harold and Karin both became United States naturalized citizens.

Family 
Gynt's husband, Harold Mattiessen, was a graduate of Swedish Royal University. Gynt's brother, Sölve Cederstrand (1900–1954), was a Swedish journalist, screenwriter, and film director. Another brother, Ragnar Cederstrand (1891–1935), was a Swedish film critic.

References

Genealogical records

Inline

Historic newspapers, magazines, and journals

External links 
 

1885 births
1956 deaths
20th-century Swedish actresses
20th-century Swedish dramatists and playwrights
20th-century American dramatists and playwrights
Pseudonymous women writers
20th-century pseudonymous writers
Swedish women dramatists and playwrights
Swedish emigrants to the United States